Tim Solliday is a contemporary California Plein-Air Painter and Western Artist who is known for his San Gabriel Valley landscapes and his paintings of American Indians and other western subjects.   He studied with the California Impressionist portrait and landscape painter Theodore Lukits (1897–1992) in the 1970s and began working professionally in the early 1980s.  Solliday is described as a painter with a "muscular, masculine style" and has been compared to artists of the Taos Ten, especially E. Martin Hennings.   He is a Signature Member of the California Art Club (f. 1909).  He exhibits with the Laguna Plein-Air Painters Association, the Oil Painters of America  and at the Maynard Dixon Invitational, which is held in Utah each year.   Solliday's work has been featured in a number of American art magazines such as Southwest Art,  American Artist and Art of the West.  Through his plein-air work in the pastel medium and large canvasses, he has played an important role in the revival of landscape painting in Southern California.

Youth and artistic training
Solliday was born in the small town of Ottumwa, Iowa, but grew up on the Palos Verdes Peninsula in southern California. His father was an artist and an illustrator, so he developed an interest in art as a young boy.  After he completed his education,  Solliday went to work in the billboard industry as an apprentice.  While he was interested in becoming a fine artist, working in outdoor advertising proved to be good experience for an aspiring painter and it enabled him to pay for his art studies.  It was while working in this commercial field that he learned about the Lukits Academy, where the Early California painter Theodore Lukits still gave students classical instruction. Solliday began his studies there in 1975. This course of study is now commonly known as the Atelier Method.  Solliday studied with Lukits for five years.  He began by "drawing from the antique" which meant doing charcoal or graphite portraits of marbles and plaster casts of ancient Roman and Greek statuary.  These studies taught the students to understand "values" which are the tonal gradations of light and shadow. Solliday moved from working from plaster casts to simple still life set-ups only after his instructor was satisfied with his work. Eventually he began to work in color, painting still life set-ups under the colored lights that Lukits used to simulate conditions an artist would find out of doors. He also attended Lukits' anatomy and life drawing classes.

Beginning plein-air painting
During the summers Solliday also began to paint “en plein-air”, directly from the landscape. He began going out painting with Arny Karl (1940–2000), an older Lukits student who had been painting out of doors for a number of years. Using the pastel medium, he, Karl and Peter Seitz Adams went on plein-air trips to the local foothills, the Southland beaches, including trips to the ocean and the San Gabriel Mountains. Solliday, Adams and Karl painted en plein-air with pastels, as their teacher Lukits had done in the 1920s and 1930s.  Solliday concluded his studies in 1980, but the thorough grounding in the old French atelier method that he received from Lukits is what he felt made his career as a figurative painter possible.

Professional career
In the early 1980s Solliday left the outdoor advertising industry to paint full-time.  He began exhibiting his works in Beverly Hills and Carmel, California.  The early works that he sold were western paintings of cowboys and American Indians which were heavily influenced by American illustrators of the early 20th century.  By the mid-1980s  he branched out into scenes of horses and horse racing that were done from sketches made at the Santa Anita racetrack.  By the 1980s and early 1990s Solliday began concentrating on plein-air landscapes instead of western subjects.  In 1994, Solliday and the illustrator Bill Stout became two of the first artists to join the organization. During this phase of his career, he exhibited his work in Pasadena  and  Los Angeles.  By 2003, Art and Antiques Magazine described Solliday as "one of the top contemporary plein-air artists." According to a recent article by the western art writer Bonnie Ganglehoff, Solliday's work has taken a new direction in recent years, because he has been working with his friend Steve Huston, a figurative painter.  In the pages of Southwest Art, she wrote that working with Huston gave his work a new dynamism.

Exhibitions
Solliday has exhibited regularly with the California Art Club, at The Pasadena Museum of California Art, the Natural History Museum of Los Angeles County and in the Maynard Dixon Country Invitational. He has also exhibited at the Luckman Fine Arts Center, California State University, Los Angeles.  He is currently represented by Maxwell Alexander Gallery in Los Angeles, CA and Trailside Galleries in Jackson, WY and Scottsdale, AZ.

Awards and honors
 1st Prize, 86th Annual California Art Club Gold Medal Exhibition, July 8–16, 1995
 1st Prize, 1993 Landscape, Oil Painters of America Annual Exhibition
 Arts for the Parks Finalist, 1993
 Arts for the Parks Finalist, 1991

See also
Atelier Method
California Art Club
California Plein-Air Painting
En plein air
Cowboy in art and culture
Landscape art
Peter Seitz Adams
Arny Karl
Billboard

Notes

Magazine references
Morseburg, Jeffrey, Tim Solliday, A Biographical Sketch, Art of California
Ganglehoff, Bonnie, Catching Up With Tim Solliday, Southwest Art Magazine, July 2008
Western Art Collector, July 2008
Editors, 'Artist Worth Watching,' Art-Talk, November 2004
Otserman, Julie, Coast to Coast,' Southwest Art, August 2004
Gangelhoff, Bonnie, 'Wild at Heart,' Southwest Art, February 2004
Herrin, Alice,  'Art Events- Texas,' Southwest Art, September 2003
Moure, Nancy Dustin Wall, 'Coming of Age,' Art & Antiques, June 2003
Editors, 'On the Scene,' Southwest Art, May 2003
Editors, 'On the Scene,' Southwest Art, March 2003
Stavig, Vikki, 'The Moods of God's Spirit,' Art of the West, January 2003
Stavig, Vikki'For the Love of the Land,' Art of the West, July 2002
Stavig, Vikki, 'Revitalization of the California Art Club,' Art of the West, May 2002
'Art Events,' Southwest Art, February 2001
Brown, Joan, 'Light Motif: California Impressionism,' Wildlife Art, December 2000
Stavig, Vikki, 'Tradition Lives On/California Art Club,' Art of the West, June 2000
Burlingham, Michael J., 'Man with a Muse,' American Artist, July 1999
Bucher, Kristen, 'Best of the West: Texas,' Southwest Art, April 1997
McGarry, Susan Hallsten, 'Variety and Harmony,' Southwest Art, February 1997
Runbeck, Katheryn, 'Tim Solliday,' Southwest Art, February 1997

Catalogs
California Art Club: 99th Annual Gold Medal Juried Exhibition, 2010 (CAC Exhibition Catalog), Artist Entry and illustration
California Art Club: 98th Annual Gold Medal Juried Exhibition, 2009 (CAC Exhibition Catalog), Artist Entry and illustration
California Art Club: 97th Annual Gold Medal Juried Exhibition, 2008 (CAC Exhibition Catalog), Artist Entry and illustration
California Art Club: 96th Annual Gold Medal Juried Exhibition, 2007 (CAC Exhibition Catalog), Artist Entry and illustration
California Art Club: 95th Annual Gold Medal Juried Exhibition, 2006 (CAC Exhibition Catalog), Artist Entry and illustration
California Art Club: 94th Annual Gold Medal Juried Exhibition, 2005 (CAC Exhibition Catalog), Artist Entry and illustration
California Art Club: 93rd Annual Gold Medal Juried Exhibition, 2004 (CAC Exhibition Catalog), Artist Entry and illustration
California Art Club: 92nd Annual Gold Medal Juried Exhibition, 2003 (CAC Exhibition Catalog), Artist Entry and illustration
California Art Club: 92nd Annual Gold Medal Juried Exhibition, 2002 (CAC Exhibition Catalog), Artist Entry and illustration
California Art Club: 91st Annual Gold Medal Juried Exhibition,  2001 (CAC Exhibition Catalog), Artist Entry and illustration

External links
California Art Club Web Site

20th-century American painters
American male painters
21st-century American painters
21st-century American male artists
Painters from California
Landscape artists
Living people
1952 births
People from Ottumwa, Iowa
20th-century American male artists